Mykhailo Mykhailyk (7 (19) October 1889 – 10 March 1937 in Kiev) was a politician and lawyer of the Ukrainian Soviet Socialist Republic.

He was born in Aleksandrovka, Slavyanoserbsk County, Yekaterinoslav Governorate (now Oleksandrivsk, Luhansk Oblast) as Yosyp Abramovych in to a Jewish family. In 1909 Yosyp turned to Orthodox Christianity and was baptised in the Russian Orthodox Church as Mykhailo. His patronymic and surname he took from personal name and surname of his godfather. Before his religious conversion, in 1905–1908 Mykhailyk was a Russian Menshevik.

In 1916 Mykhailyk graduated the Jurist faculty (predecessor of the Kharkiv Law Institute) of the Kharkiv University. After school in 1916–1917 he served in the Russian Imperial Army.

In 1918 Mykhailyk worked in the Ministry of Land Melioration of the Ukrainian State. During that time he was a member of the left-wing Ukrainian Party of Socialist Revolutionaries (before adaptation of Communist-Borotbists).

Soon after the second occupation of Kyiv by the Soviet troops following the Battle of Kiev, in April 1919 Mykhailyk joined Bolsheviks and the Kiev Revolutionary Committee. In 1919-1920 Mykhailyk was a member of orgburo and committee of the Communist Party of Eastern Galicia and Bucovina and later the Galician org committee of the Central Committee of the Communist Party (Bolsheviks) of Ukraine. In 1920 he was a deputy politruk of Galician forces and an assistant commander of the Galician Red Army forces.

From 1933 to 1935 he was its Prosecutor General. He was tried by a court chaired by Vasiliy Ulrikh and shot in 1937, but he was rehabilitated in September 1956.

References

External links
 Mykhailo Mykhailyk (Михайлик Михаил Васильевич). Handbook on history of the Communist Party and the Soviet Union 1898–1991

1889 births
1937 deaths
People from Oleksandrivsk
People from Yekaterinoslav Governorate
Ukrainian Jews
Mensheviks
Converts to Eastern Orthodoxy from Judaism
National University of Kharkiv alumni
Ukrainian jurists
Ukrainian revolutionaries
Ukrainian people of World War I
Russian military personnel of World War I
Borotbists
Bolsheviks
General Prosecutors of Ukraine
Judges of the Supreme Court of Ukraine
Soviet justice ministers of Ukraine
Union for the Freedom of Ukraine trial
Ukrainian Trotskyists
Great Purge victims from Ukraine
Jews executed by the Soviet Union
Jewish socialists